Big Brother is the Dutch & Belgian cooperation version of the international reality television franchise Big Brother produced by Endemol. The show aired in Netherlands on RTL5 and in  the Flemish Region of VIER/Play4 and has had a total of two seasons.  The first season of the show aired in 2021.

It was the comeback of Big Brother in the Netherlands after a 14 years absence and in Belgium after a 13 years absence.

Format
The format of Big Brother has the same format as the international Big Brother franchise. A group of strangers lives together in an isolated home. They have to work together to succeed in tasks but next to that they also have to nominate each other. The nominated housemates are up for eviction by the audience. Ultimately, the last housemate who leaves the house is the winner. The program was reintroduced in as the ultimate social experiment.

The series introduced concept changes to the previous Dutch and Belgian versions, some inspired by the American and Canadian versions:
 the housemaster: a housemate who had more privileges compared to other housemates and had immunity for the nominations.
 the jackpot: the money prize was built by winning challenges.
 the voting of the audience: while in previous editions the audience had to vote for the exit of one of the nominated housemates, the viewer had to vote know for the housemate they wanted to keep in the house. Voting was free for this series while in previous editions the viewer had to phone a paid number or send text messages.
 the influence of the audience: in this series the audience had an influence at the Big Brother house and its housemates. They could vote for rewards, such as choosing which housemate would become caretaker, but in the second season they could also vote for punishments.

The house
A new house was built in Amsterdam. It was built next to the Johan Cruyff Arena at a parking lot of Endemol Shine Nederland in a few months. It was a 300 m2 House and had 125 cameras installed (100 indoor cameras and 25 outdoor cameras) and 39 speakers. All cameras were remote controlled compared to the hidden walkways with camera men in the previous editions.

For the second season, the house was completely restyled. A bigger entrance was built at the garden. The gameroom was extended and a shop added. A bathtub was added in the places of one of the showers.

The house was again redecorated for the thirth season. An outdoor game are, a wall and secret room were added. Next to the house, a showbuilding was build.

History
In 1999 Veronica launched Big Brother in the Netherlands. It was an idea of John De Mol. It was a huge success and the concept was sold international. In the Netherlands there were six regular seasons and two celebrity editions, until it disappeared from screen in 2006. In Belgium the first series was launched in 2000 which became one of the most successful series international. It was followed with another five regular seasons, two celebrity seasons and an all-stars season until it was cancelled in 2007.

20 years after the launch of Big Brother, EndemolShine revealed in September 2019 they wanted to bring the series back to the Netherlands. In July 2020 broadcoaster RTL5 announced Big Brother would return in the Netherlands after a 14 years absence and to celebrate the 20th anniversary of the Big Brother franchise. Some weeks later it was announced it would be a cooperation with the Flemish part of Belgium were the series would be broadcoasted by VIER/Play4. The first season was for three years in preparation. The concept was based at the American and Canadian versions that were still very successful. This meant housemates could speak freely about nominations and that housemates had to play the game more tactical. Producer Jeroen Compeer called it the beginning of a new Big Brother era. Following misbehavior in other international series, this series made a guideline which future housemates had to read and sign. This guideline featured rules about expected behavior, including a thumbs up from both housemates who would become intimate to make sure both give permission and are full of consciousness. Other measures involved no alcohol before 7pm.

The launch of the first season had very high ratings. It had more than 1.3 million viewers in the Netherlands and over 500,000 viewers in Belgium. The reboot was responsible for being SBS Belgium's best January ever. The season had good rating, online and lineair. In the first three weeks the season had an average of 447.859 viewers in Flanders. Online it had 2.708.173 views. The livestream was watched in the first weeks a 1.017.899 times. A new medium that had to be considered was social media. During the first season, the housemates were confronted with social media. This could be posts at social media by themselves before their time in the house but also reactions of viewers. Shortly after showing some messages of viewers, three housemates left the house voluntarily. Later during the season, there was so much commotion at social media about housemate Jerrel Baumann, producers decided to put all social media of the series for a few days in black. The winner of the first season was Jill Goede. There was controversy because the voting websites crashed during the final vote. The winner was declared by a bailiff consulting the last intermediate score. The final was watched by 488.000 viewers in the Netherlands and 401.062 viewers in Belgium.VIER/Play4 was satisfied with the first season. It had an average of 377.000 television viewers, 9,5 million views at the website and 3,5 million views for the livestream in Flanders. It had an average of 507.000 viewers in the Netherlands. The voice of Big Brother was one of the most successful ingedrients this season. When the season ended, it was revealed Jeroen Compaer was the voice behind Big Brother. He was selected through a casting to find a voice that would appeal to both Dutch and Belgian viewers. While the idea in the beginning was to make Big Brother a friendly psychopath, this idea changed throughout the season. However it stayed important for Big Brother not displaying any emotion.

A second season followed in 2022. Following the criticism during the first season, the producers changed a lot to make the second season more exciting by creating week themes, more challenges for the housemates and making the influence of the viewers bigger. Thomas Nagels, housemate of the first season, joined the creative team with his experience of living in the house himself.  The ratings of the launch dropped considerably with 586.000 viewers in the Netherlands at both RTL4 & RTL5, a drop of 56%, and 376.510 viewers at the Belgian Play4. The season made headlines when Big Brother gave warnings following racistic, discriminating and sexistic remarks and behaviour. The first couple, Dimitri Rodaro and Vera Dijkstra got a lot of attention. By the end of February it was announced the series would end two weeks sooner than the expected finale. Producers stated it was always planned this way and was a way to have another twist for the housemates. The housemates weren't informed about the conflict between Russia and Ukraine since no housemates had family or relatives involved. In one of the last weeks, a plane flew over the house with a banner supporting housemate Nawel Seghairi, who had been nominated for six weeks in a row. Actress and writer Leen Dendievel pointed to Seghairi's nominations at International Women's Day to show its importance, saying Seghairi is a strong woman who is always nominated by male housemates who can't handle such women. Viewers complained when Kristof Timmermans won a golden key to the final, more than two weeks for the final. It had many consequences for the other housemates meaning popular housemates had to leave the house. Viewers said the ticket for Timmermans was fixed by producers, stating the producers wanted two belgian and two dutch housemates, one male and one female of each nationality, for the final week. Spokesman Salomon of Play4 denied Timmermans was protected. The season was won by Salar Abassi Abraasi. The final had 295.000 viewers in the Netherland and 208.449 viewers in Belgium.

The series returned for a thirth season in January 2023. The concept of the program was rethought, focussing on the housemates playing individual and adding the power of nomination of international series and the Big Brother coins. The season had to played much more individual. Outcaster from the first weeks Jason Glas became very popular with the audience. They arranged a plane with banner for him. Because the game was played much more individual, there were more tensions then the previous seasons. The livestream was even stopped one time. However the housemates had lots of sympathy. Hosts Kemper and Beloy said there were never more Valentine cards and gifts than for the housemates of that season. Viewers complained when the evicted housemate Danny Volkers was able to return to the house and compete back in the game.

Series details and viewership

Presentation

Broadcasting
The show was broadcoasted in the Netherlands at RTL 5 and the premiere also at RTL 4. The show was broadcast on Vier (later rebranded as Play4) in Flanders.

Live stream 
The live stream was on a special channel 247 at Telenet and Vier.be (later changed to Play4.be) in Flanders. In the Netherlands it had two live streams at Videoland.

Notable contestants
Liese Luwel from season 1 was the contestant who stayed for the longest time in the Big Brother house. She entered during the launch and got to the final. The other  two seasons were shortened in time, making her the only housemate staying for 99 days in the house. Nawel Seghairi  of the second season was the contestant who received the most nominations. She was nominated eight times in a row by mostly male housemates. Danny Volker of season 3  was the first housemate to return to the house and compete again after being evicted.

Season 1 winner Jill Goede created her own clothing line and appeared in other television programs. Season 1 runner-up Nick Kraft enjoyed bigger succes with his alterego Ronny Retro and even played at Tomorrowland.

References

External links
 Big Brother 2021 website
 Dutch official website on RTL
 Belgian official website on Play4

07
Big Brother (franchise)
2020s Belgian television series
2020s Dutch television series
Belgian reality television series
Dutch reality television series
Dutch-language television shows
Play4 (TV channel) original programming
RTL 5 original programming